Daniel Joseph Edelman (July 3, 1920 – January 15, 2013) was an American public relations executive who founded the world's largest public relations firm, Edelman. Edelman had a significant influence on the methodology of public relations.

Life and career
Edelman was born to a Jewish family in Manhattan. He attended DeWitt Clinton High School in the Bronx. He then attended Columbia University, graduating in 1940, then earning a master's degree in journalism.

His first job was working as a sports reporter in Poughkeepsie, New York. After serving in a United States Army psychological warfare unit during World War II, he was a night news reporter at CBS before taking work promoting jazz artists.

In 1947 Edelman moved to Chicago as public relations director for hair care product line Toni Home Permanent Co. (now a division of Gillette). In 1952 he founded Edelman there. His son Richard Edelman became President & chief executive officer in 1985.

Edelman died of congestive heart failure in Chicago.

References

External links
Dan Edelman (1920–2013) via Edelman

1920 births
2013 deaths
Businesspeople from New York City
Columbia University Graduate School of Journalism alumni
United States Army personnel of World War II
20th-century American businesspeople
DeWitt Clinton High School alumni